CJFI-FM is a First Nations community radio station operating at 107.1 MHz (FM) in Moose Factory, Ontario, Canada. The station is branded as The Island-Youth Radio.

History
The station started broadcasting in the fall of 2011. CJFI-FM is officially owned by Moose Cree First Nation, but has been associated with the Moose River Broadcasting Association. It is a non-profit, community radio station. CJFI 107.1 The Island also streams online through the online streaming service MIXLR via its website and through Moose Cree First Nations home page.  The radio station transmits at 50 watts with a 7 km radius. The Island currently broadcasts from the John R. Delaney Youth Centre in Moose Factory.

References

External links
The Island
Moose Cree First Nation 
 

Jfi
Jfi
Jfi
Year of establishment missing